Security contractor may refer to:

 Private military company
 Private police
 Security company
 Security guard
 Mercenary

See also
 Independent contractor
 Private defense agency